Christopher Robert Smith, Baron Smith of Finsbury,   (born 24 July 1951) is a British politician and a peer; a former Member of Parliament (MP) and Cabinet Minister;  and former chairman of the Environment Agency.  For the majority of his career he was a Labour Party member. He was the first openly gay male British MP, coming out in 1984, and in 2005, the first MP to acknowledge that he is HIV positive. Since 2015 he has been Master of Pembroke College, Cambridge.

Early life
Chris Smith was born in Barnet, London, and educated at George Watson's College in Edinburgh and Pembroke College, Cambridge. At Cambridge he gained a first class honours degree in English, and a PhD with a thesis on Coleridge and Wordsworth. He attended Harvard University as a Kennedy Scholar, and was president of the Cambridge Union Society.

Member of Parliament
He worked for a housing charity and became a councillor in the London Borough of Islington. He came third at Epsom and Ewell in the 1979 general election before narrowly winning the seat of Islington South and Finsbury at the 1983 general election, defeating George Cunningham, who had ultimately defected to the Social Democrats from Labour. Cunningham stood again at the 1987 general election when Smith retained the seat.

In 1984, he became Britain's first gay MP to choose to "come out". There had been several gay MPs before this whose homosexuality had been common knowledge in some circles, including their constituents in some cases, but they had not been completely open about it. (In 1975 Maureen Colquhoun had been effectively "outed" by press revelations.) During a rally in Rugby, Warwickshire, against a possible ban on gay employees by the town council, Smith began his speech: "Good afternoon, I'm Chris Smith, I'm the Labour MP for Islington South and Finsbury and I'm gay." This was unscripted, and the decision to include it in his speech was made at the last minute. He immediately received a standing ovation from most of the audience.

He became an opposition whip in 1986, a shadow Treasury minister from 1987 to 1992, and shadowed the environment, heritage, pensions and health portfolios between 1992 and 1997.

Secretary of State for Culture, Media and Sport
In 1997, he was appointed to Tony Blair's Cabinet as the Secretary of State for Culture, Media and Sport. As a Minister known to have a close connection with the arts scene in Britain, his time at DCMS is generally regarded as a success, for many projects funded through the National Lottery came to fruition. There were controversies, such as his approval during his first week as minister of the appointment of Mary Allen to the Royal Opera House. In this case, a Select Committee report later found that he had exceeded his authority and had improperly failed to seek advice from his Permanent Secretary. In 2000, he managed to secure a tax rebate that enabled many museums to give free admission. 
He held this position throughout the Labour government's first term, but was sacked and returned to the back benches after the 2001 election, being replaced by Tessa Jowell.

Appointment to the House of Lords
After over 20 years in Parliament, Smith stepped down from the House of Commons at the 2005 general election. It was announced on 30 April 2005 that he was to be created a life peer, and the title was gazetted on 22 June 2005 as Baron Smith of Finsbury, of Finsbury in the London Borough of Islington.

Retirement from politics
Smith was appointed Chair of the London Cultural Consortium (successor body to the Cultural Strategy Group) by Ken Livingstone, the then Mayor of London, and served from 2005 to 2008. He was awarded an Honorary Fellowship in 2010 from the University of Cumbria. In November 2006, he was appointed as Chairman of the Advertising Standards Authority. He was one of the founding directors of the Clore Leadership Programme, an initiative aimed at helping to train and develop new leaders of Britain's cultural sector. He is also currently Chairman of the Wordsworth Trust.

Smith is a keen mountaineer, and was the first MP to climb all the 3,000 ft "Munros" in Scotland; in April 2004, he was elected President of the Ramblers' Association. He is a patron of London-based HIV charity The Food Chain, and also Patron of HIV support charity The National Long-Term Survivors Group (NLTSG).

Smith was announced as the new Chairman of the Environment Agency on 8 May 2008, and took up the new role in mid-July. In an interview with The Independent in August that year he said Britain faced hard choices over which coasts to defend and which to leave to the sea, because it would not be possible to save all coastal homes from sea erosion. Lord Smith was re-appointed as Chair of the Environment Agency for a further three years by Environment Secretary Caroline Spelman in 2011. On re-appointment he received £100,813 pro rata for 2011–12, based on working three days a week. Lord Smith continued in this role until 13 July 2014.

Smith became a vice-president of the Campaign for Homosexual Equality in February 2009.

In December 2014, it was announced that Lord Smith would become the next Master of Pembroke College, Cambridge in 2015, succeeding Sir Richard Dearlove. He accepted an invitation to become the Chairman of Trustees of the Cambridge Union Society in 2015.

He is currently listed as the Chairman of the Task Force on Shale Gas.

Personal life 
In 2006, Smith entered a civil partnership with Dorian Jabri, his partner since 1989. The couple separated in 2012. Smith was a director of the Finsbury-based world jazz ensemble Grand Union Orchestra for a period in the mid-1990s.

HIV status 
In 2003, Smith was contacted by a reporter from The Sunday Times asking for a comment on his health but declined, citing the Press Complaints Code. However, two years later, in 2005, he contacted the paper's editor and revealed in a story, titled "Why This is the Time to Break my HIV Silence", he had been diagnosed as HIV-positive as long ago as 1987. He stated he had decided to go public following Nelson Mandela's announcement of his son's death from AIDS.

Notes

References

External links
 
 Parliamentary Biography of Lord Smith of Finsbury

|-

|-

|-

|-

|-

|-

1951 births
Living people
2012 Summer Olympics cultural ambassadors
Alumni of Pembroke College, Cambridge
Councillors in the London Borough of Islington
Fellows of King's College London
Gay politicians
Harvard University alumni
Kennedy Scholarships
Labour Party (UK) life peers
Labour Party (UK) MPs for English constituencies
LGBT life peers
LGBT members of the Parliament of the United Kingdom
English LGBT politicians
Members of the Privy Council of the United Kingdom
People educated at George Watson's College
People from Chipping Barnet
People with HIV/AIDS
Politics of the London Borough of Islington
UK MPs 1983–1987
UK MPs 1987–1992
UK MPs 1992–1997
UK MPs 1997–2001
UK MPs 2001–2005
Chairs of the Fabian Society
Presidents of the Cambridge Union
LGBT government ministers
21st-century LGBT people
Life peers created by Elizabeth II